This is the results breakdown of the local elections held in Cantabria on 26 May 2019. The following tables show detailed results in the autonomous community's most populous municipalities, sorted alphabetically.

Opinion polls

City control
The following table lists party control in the most populous municipalities, including provincial capitals (shown in bold). Gains for a party are displayed with the cell's background shaded in that party's colour.

Municipalities

Santander
Population: 172,044

Torrelavega
Population: 51,687

See also
2019 Cantabrian regional election

References

Cantabria
2019